opened in Seki, Gifu Prefecture, Japan, in 1976. The collection and its display relate the natural and culture history of the area.

See also
 List of Cultural Properties of Japan - paintings (Gifu)
 List of Historic Sites of Japan (Gifu)
 Museum of Fine Arts, Gifu

References

External links

  Gifu Prefectural Museum

Museums in Gifu Prefecture
Museums established in 1976
1976 establishments in Japan
Seki, Gifu